The tradition of humor in Judaism dates back to the Torah and the Midrash from the ancient Middle East, but generally refers to the more recent stream of verbal and often anecdotal humor of Ashkenazi Jews which took root in the United States over the last hundred years, including in secular Jewish culture. European Jewish humor in its early form developed in the Jewish community of the Holy Roman Empire, with theological satire becoming a traditional way of clandestinely opposing Christianization.

Modern Jewish humor emerged during the nineteenth century among German-speaking Jews of the Haskalah (Jewish Enlightenment), matured in the shtetls of the Russian Empire, and then flourished in twentieth-century America, arriving with the millions of Jews who emigrated from Eastern Europe between the 1880s and the early 1920s. 

Beginning with vaudeville and continuing through radio, stand-up, film, and television, a disproportionately high percentage of American, British, German, and Russian comedians have been Jewish. Time estimated in 1978 that 80 percent of professional American comics were Jewish.

Jewish humor is diverse, though it most often favors wordplay, irony, and satire, while its themes are highly anti-authoritarian, mocking religious and secular life alike. Sigmund Freud considered Jewish humor unique in that its humor is primarily derived from mocking the in-group (Jews) rather than the "other". However, rather than simply being self-deprecating, it also contains an element of self-praise.

History
Jewish humor is rooted in several traditions. Recent scholarship places the origins of Jewish humor in one of history's earliest recorded documents, the Hebrew Bible, as well as the Talmud. In particular, the intellectual and legal methods of the Talmud, which uses elaborate legal arguments and situations often seen as so absurd as to be humorous, in order to tease out the meaning of religious law.

Hillel Halkin in his essay about Jewish humor traces some roots of the Jewish self-deprecating humor to the medieval influence of Arabic traditions on the Hebrew literature by quoting a witticism from Yehuda Alharizi's Tahkemoni. A later Sephardic tradition centered on a Nasreddin-derived folk character known as Djohá.

A more recent one is an egalitarian tradition among the Jewish communities of Eastern Europe in which the powerful were often mocked subtly, rather than attacked overtly—as Saul Bellow once put it, "Oppressed people tend to be witty." Jesters known as badchens used to poke fun at prominent members of the community during weddings, creating a good-natured tradition of humor as a levelling device. Rabbi Moshe Waldoks, a scholar of Jewish humor, argued:

After Jews began to migrate to America in large numbers, they, like other minority groups, found it difficult to gain mainstream acceptance and obtain upward mobility (as Lenny Bruce lampooned, "He was charming. ... They said, 'C'mon! Let's go watch the Jew be charming!). The newly-developing entertainment industry, combined with the Jewish humor tradition, provided a potential route for Jews to succeed. One of the first successful radio "sitcoms", The Goldbergs, featured a Jewish family. As radio and television matured, many of its most famous comedians, including Jack Benny, Sid Caesar, George Burns, Eddie Cantor, Jack Carter, Henny Youngman, Milton Berle, and Jerry Lewis were Jewish. The Jewish comedy tradition continues today, with Jewish humor much entwined with that of mainstream humor, as comedies like Seinfeld, Curb Your Enthusiasm, and Woody Allen films indicate.

Sigmund Freud in his Jokes and their Relation to the Unconscious, among other things, analyzes the nature of Jewish jokes.

Types

Religious humor
As befits a community to which religion was so important, much humor centres on the relationship of Judaism to the individual Jew and the community.

The part left out is the fact that it was traditional to go to services, regardless of what one believed, and the rabbi was merely following that tradition.  This is like the story of the boy who tells his rabbi he can't daven (pray), because he no longer believes in God. The rabbi merely tells him, "Yes God, no God: doesn't matter! Three times a day, you DAVEN!"

Assimilation
The American Jewish community has been lamenting the rate of assimilation and absence of their children as they grow into adults.

Self-deprecating
Jews often mock their own negative stereotypes.

Wit
Similarly, in the tradition of the legal arguments of the Talmud, one prominent type of Jewish humor involves clever, often legalistic, solutions to Talmudic problems, such as:

Tales of the Rebbes
Some jokes make fun of the "Rebbe miracle stories" and involve different Hasidim bragging about their teachers' miraculous abilities:

Or

The lives of the early Hasidim, while not funny in and of themselves, are rich in humorous incidents. The dealings between rabbis, tzadikim, and peasants form a rich tapestry of lore.

Eastern European Jewish humor
A number of traditions in Jewish humor date back to stories and anecdotes from the 19th century.

Chełm

Jewish folklore makes fun of the Jewish residents of Chełm (Yiddish: כעלעם, Hebrew: חלם; often transcribed as Helm) in eastern Poland for their foolishness. These stories often center on the "wise" men and their silly decisions, similarly to the English Wise Men of Gotham or the German Schildbürger. The jokes were almost always about silly solutions to problems. Some of these solutions display "foolish wisdom" (reaching the correct answer by the wrong train of reasoning), while others are simply wrong.

Many of these stories have become well-known thanks to storytellers and writers such as Isaac Bashevis Singer, a Nobel Prize-winning Jewish writer in the Yiddish language, who wrote The Fools of Chełm and Their History (published in English translation in 1973), and the great Soviet Yiddish poet Ovsey Driz who wrote stories in verse. The latter achieved great popularity in the Soviet Union in Russian and Ukrainian translations, and were made into several animated films.

Other notable adaptations of folklore Chełm stories into the mainstream culture are the comedy Chelmer Chachomim ("The Wise Men of Chelm") by Aaron Zeitlin, The Heroes of Chelm (1942) by Shlomo Simon, published in English translation as The Wise Men of Helm (Solomon Simon, 1945) and More Wise Men of Helm (Solomon Simon, 1965), and the book Chelmer Chachomim by Y. Y. Trunk.  The animated short film comedy Village of Idiots also recounts Chełm tales.

Allen Mandelbaum's "Chelmaxioms : The Maxims, Axioms, Maxioms of Chelm" (David R. Godine, 1978) treats the wise men less as fools than as an "echt Chelm" of true scholars who in their narrow specialized knowledge are nonetheless knowledgeable but lacking sense. 
The poetry of [Chelmaxioms] is supposedly the discovered lost manuscripts of the wise men of Chelm.

Here are a few examples of a Chełm tale:

Hershele Ostropoler
Hershele Ostropoler, also known as Hershel of Ostropol, was a legendary prankster who was based on a historic figure. Thought to have come from Ukraine, he lived in the small village of Ostropol, working as shochet, a ritual slaughterer. According to legend he lost his job because of his constant joking, which offended the leaders of the village.

In his subsequent wanderings throughout Ukraine, he became a familiar figure at restaurants and inns.

Eventually he settled down at the court of Rabbi Boruch of Medzhybizh, grandson of the Baal Shem Tov. The rabbi was plagued by frequent depressions, and Hershele served as a sort of court jester, mocking the rabbi and his cronies, to the delight of the common folk.

After his death he was remembered in a series of pamphlets recording his tales and witty remarks.

He was the subject of several epic poems, a novel, a comedy performed in 1930 by the Vilna Troupe, and a U.S. television programme in the 1950s.  Two illustrated children's books, The Adventures of Hershel of Ostropol, and Hershel and the Hanukkah Goblins, have been published. Both books were written by Eric Kimmel and illustrated by Trina Schart Hyman.  In 2002, a play entitled Hershele the Storyteller was performed in New York City. He is also the protagonist in a new series of comics for children with the titles The Adventures of Hershele, Hershele Rescues the Captives, Hershele and the Treasure in Yerushalayim, Hershele makes the Grade, and Hershele Discovers America.

Humor about antisemitism
Much Jewish humor takes the form of self-deprecating comments on Jewish culture, acting as a shield against antisemitic stereotypes by exploiting them first:

Or, on a similar note:

And another example, a direct slice of galgenhumor (gallows humor):

There is also humor originating in the United States, such as this joke:

This one combines accusations of the lack of patriotism, and avarice:

American Jewish humor
A 2013 survey by the Pew Research Center found that 42 percent of American Jews rated humor as essential to their Jewish identity.

About religion
One common strain of Jewish humor examines the role of religion in contemporary life, often gently mocking the religious hypocrite. For example:

Or, on differences between Orthodox, Conservative and Reform movements:

In particular, Reform Jews may be lampooned for their rejection of traditional Jewish beliefs. An example, from one of Woody Allen's early stand-up routines:

Jokes have been made about the shifting of gender roles (in the more traditional Orthodox movement, women marry at a young age and have many children, while the more liberal Conservative and Reform movements make gender roles more egalitarian, even ordaining women as Rabbis). The Reconstructionist movement was the first to ordain homosexuals, all of which leads to this joke:

Often jokes revolve around the social practice of the Jewish religion:

As with most ethnicities, jokes have often mocked Jewish accents—at times gently, and at others quite harshly. One of the kinder examples is:

About Jews
Jewish humor continues to exploit stereotypes of Jews, both as a sort of "in-joke", and as a form of self-defence. Jewish mothers, "cheapness"/frugality, kvetching,  and other stereotyped habits are all common subjects. Frugality has been frequently singled out:

Or,

Or,

Or,

Or,

Or,

Or, about traditional roles of men and women in Jewish families:

Or,

Or, on parenting (from David Bader's Haikus for Jews):

Or

Or

Or, on kvetching (complaining),

A version of that joke is quoted in Born To Kvetch: Yiddish Language and Culture in All Its Moods, by Michael Wex, who writes,
 "It contains virtually every important element of the Yiddish-speaking mind-set in easily accessible form: the constant tension between the Jewish and the non-Jewish; the faux naivete that allows the old man to pretend that he isn't disturbing anyone; the deflation of the other passenger's hopes, the disappointment of all his expectations after he has watered the Jew; and most importantly of all, the underlying assumption, the fundamental idea that kvetching—complaining—is not only a pastime, not only a response to adverse or imperfect circumstance, but a way of life that has nothing to do with the fulfillment or frustration of desire."

About Christianity
Many Jewish jokes involve a rabbi and a Christian clergyman, exploiting different interpretations of a shared environment. Often they start with something like "A rabbi and a priest..." and make fun of either the rabbi's interpretation of Christianity or (seeming) differences between Christian and Jewish interpretation of some areas.

Jewish humor in the Soviet Union

See Russian jokes in general, or more specifically Rabinovich jokes, Russian Jewish jokes, Russian political jokes; also History of the Jews in Russia and the Soviet Union.

Or, in the last years of the Soviet Union:

Or

Israeli humor

Israeli humor featured many of the same themes as Jewish humor elsewhere, making fun of the country and its habits, while containing a fair bit of gallows humor as well, as a joke from a 1950 Israeli joke book indicates:

Israelis' view of themselves:

Role of Yiddish

Some Yiddish words may sound comical to an English speaker. Terms like shnook and shmendrik, shlemiel and shlimazel (often considered inherently funny words) were exploited for their humorous sounds, as were  "Yinglish" shm-reduplication constructs, such as "fancy-schmancy".  Yiddish constructions—such as ending sentences with questions—became part of the verbal word play of Jewish comedians.

See also
 Happiness in Judaism
 Ethnic joke
 List of American Jewish comedians
 The Bible and humor
 Holocaust humor

References

Notes

Bibliography 
 Sover, Arie. 2021. Jewish Humor: An outcome of Historical Experience, Survival, and Wisdom. London: Cambridge Scholars
 San Diego Jewish Chronicle on Jewish Humor
 Funny People - A Film About Jewish Humor
 Harry Liechter's Jewish Humor site
 Novak, William & Waldoks, Moshe Big Book of Jewish Humor, originally published by Harper Perennial (1981) .
 The Jewish jokes of a word in your eye
 Jewish Jokes Comedy Comics and Humor at Oy Vey

Further reading 
Jay Allen (1990). 500 Great Jewish Jokes. Signet. .
Morey Amsterdam (1959). Keep Laughing. Citadel.
Elliot Beier (1968). Wit and Wisdon of Israel. Peter Pauper.
Noah BenShea (1993). Great Jewish Quotes. Ballantine Books. .
Arthur Berger (1997). The Genius of the Jewish Joke. Jason Aronson. .
Milton Berle (1996). More of the Best of Milton Berle's Private Joke File. Castle Books. .
Milton Berle (1945). Out of my Trunk. Bantam.
Sam Hoffman (2010). Old Jews Telling Jokes. Villard.
David Minkoff (2006). Oy! The Ultimate Book of Jewish Jokes. Thomas Dunne Books. .
David Minkoff (2008). Oy! The Great Jewish Joke Book. JR Books. .
Elliott Oring (1984). The Jokes of Sigmund Freud. Univ. of Pennsylvania Press. .
Richard Raskin (1992). Life Is Like a Glass of Tea. Studies of Classic Jewish Jokes. Aarhus University Press. .
Sandor Schuman (2012). Adirondack Mendel's Aufruf: Welcome to Chelm's Pond. .
Joseph Telushkin (1998). Jewish Humor: What the Best Jewish Jokes Say About the Jews. Harper Paperbacks. .
Simcha Weinstein (2008).  Shtick Shift: Jewish Humor in the 21st Century. Barricade Books. .
Ruth R. Wisse (2013). No Joke: Making Jewish Humor. Princeton Univ. Press. .
Ralph Woods (1969). The Joy of Jewish Humor. Simon & Schuster. .
 Alter Druyanov (1969, Tel Aviv). "Sefer Habdikhah ve-hakhidud," 3 vols. - in Hebrew).

External links
 "On Jewish Humor" a discourse in English by "the Jewish Philosopher", C. Israel Lutsky. Yiddish Radio Project (one of their few English-language recordings). 7-minute RealAudio recording.
 Never Mind, I'll Just Sit Here in the Dark: A brief history of the Jewish mother.'', Slate, June 13, 2007
 Modern Jewish Humor
 Laughter is the best medicine Craig Nudelman - June 14, 2017, Cape Jewish Chronicle

 
Jewish literature
Secular Jewish culture
Yiddish culture
Jokes
Ethnic humour